Otis William Oldfield (July 3, 1890 – May 18, 1969) was a San Francisco painter, printmaker and art educator.

Early life and education 
Otis William Oldfield was born on July 3, 1890, in Sacramento, California. He attended Sutter High School but at age 16 he dropped out of school in order to work.

In 1908, he attended Best’s Art School in San Francisco, operated by Alice Leveque Best and Arthur William Best. In 1911, he moved to Paris to attend Académie Julian. He remained in France until 1924, then moved back to San Francisco.

Career 

In 1925, Oldfield had a successful solo show at San Francisco’s Galerie Beaux Arts, an exhibit of work made while he was living in France. In 1929, Oldfield had two exhibitions of San Francisco water scenes at Montross Gallery in New York City.

The following year in 1930, Oldfield worked with architect Timothy Pflueger to create painted windows for the bar at the Pacific Coast Stock Exchange. In 1934, he was one of 26 artists selected to paint murals in the newly erected Coit Tower. One of his frescos there is titled Shipping Activities Inside the Golden Gate.

Teaching 
Starting in 1925, he taught at California School of Fine Art (now San Francisco Art Institute) painting and drawing courses. From 1946 until 1952 he taught at the California College of Arts and Crafts (now called California College of the Arts or CCA).

Oldfield's students included Yun Gee, Richard Diebenkorn, and Nathan Oliveira.

Death and legacy 
Oldfield died on May 18, 1969, in San Francisco, California. He was survived by his wife , who continued to paint until her death in 1981.

His work is in public museum collections include at Fine Arts Museums of San Francisco, Los Angeles County Museum of Art, Crocker Art Museum, National Gallery of Art, Smithsonian American Art Museum, Metropolitan Museum of Art,

References

External links
 
 Otis Oldfield's artist estate website

California College of the Arts faculty
Artists from the San Francisco Bay Area
American muralists
Public Works of Art Project artists
1890 births
1969 deaths
20th-century American painters
American male painters
San Francisco Art Institute faculty
Académie Julian alumni
20th-century American male artists